Shengelia is a Georgian surname that may refer to:

 Irakli Shengelia (born 1981), Georgian footballer
 Ramaz Shengelia (1957–2012), Soviet footballer
 Tornike Shengelia (born 1991), Georgian basketball player
 Levan Shengelia (born 1995), Georgian footballer

Surnames of Abkhazian origin
Georgian-language surnames
Surnames of Georgian origin